Twenty20 Kizhakkambalam is an Indian nonprofit charitable organization at Kizhakkambalam in Ernakulam district, Kerala. The prime objective of the organization is to make Kizhakkambalam Grama Panchayat the best Grama Panchayat in India by 2020. This organization won the elections in the local body elections in 2015.

History
Twenty20 Kizhakkambalam is a nonprofit charitable organization promoted by the Kitex Garments, a garment exporting company part of the Anna Kitex Group—ranked in Forbes Asia's 200 Best Under A Billion Dollar companies. In the 2015 Grama Panchayat elections, the organization won 17 out of 19 seats in the village council and secured 69 percent of vote share. According to Sabu M. Jacob, the Managing Director of Kitex Garments, the victory was because of the failure of the prevailing political parties. Kitex Garments disbursed its Corporate Social Responsibility (CSR) funds for the development and welfare schemes undertaken by Twenty20.

Development activities
Twenty20 has taken lead in providing drinking water to the people of Kizhakkambalam.  They have also taken interest in making toilets; repairing houses; sponsoring surgeries and wedding; building places of worship and donating seeds and agricultural implements. The organization runs a grocery shop in Kizhakkambalam supplying  vegetables and groceries at half the market price. 7,000 families are visiting the market regularly to buy provisions.

During the 2020 Kerala Local body elections, party has won nine seats in Aikkaranadu panchayat, five seats in Kunnathunad and five seats in Mazhuvannur higher than the 17 of the 19 seats in Kizhakkambalam in 2015.

Anti alcohol movement 
Twenty20 promised to make Kizhakkambalam an alcohol free village.  This was the main offer of the organization during the election campaign in November, 2015. And they kept their word by closing down the only beverage outlet available in this area.

References

State political parties in Kerala
Suburbs of Kochi
2015 establishments in Kerala
Organizations established in 2015
History of Kerala (1947–present)